Birkdale School is a Christian independent school for pupils aged 4–18, in the city of Sheffield, South Yorkshire in England. Founded by Maurice Asterley, in 1904, the school provides education underpinned by a strong Christian ethos.

Birkdale is a member of the Headmasters' and Headmistresses' Conference, and is a registered charity, educating roughly 1000 students per annum. Previously just a boys school, since 1995 girls have been admitted to the Sixth Form, with the whole school becoming co-educational in September 2020, starting with the youngest four year groups.

History 
Birkdale was founded in 1904 by Maurice Asterley as a preparatory school for boys between the ages of 4 and 13 to provide a Christian education and takes its name from its first home, Birkdale House on Newbould Lane. The school moved in 1915 to the Oakholme building under Griffiths' leadership (1909–1939).

At the start of the Second World War, the school evacuated to Derbyshire under Roberts, Head Master in 1939. After the war, Roberts moved his pupils to Uttoxeter creating Brocksford Hall School, whilst twenty boys returned to Oakholme Road under Heeley in 1942 who later became Head Master in 1943. The Westbury building was purchased in 1946 from Thomas Cole of Cole Brothers (now John Lewis) to allow for the continued expansion of the school. The Endcliffe building on Endcliffe Crescent was purchased in 1975 with the Grayson and Johnson Buildings following in 1994 and 1999 respectively to create the current school and campus.

The period of greatest growth within the School was overseen during the tenure of the M. D. A. Hepworth, Head Master from 1983 to 1998. More recently, an extension of the Grayson Building was built to house the Sixth Form common room and an extension was also built on the back to allow space for the Modern Languages department and additional science laboratories. The Octagon, a music practice room designed to amplify sound was added to the original Oakholme Building in 1989. As part of a major building project, which saw the construction of a large sports hall over the site of an outdoor swimming pool, the Caxton building was built to house the DT and IT departments.  The science labs and Heeley Hall were built recently.

Buildings

Birkdale School consists of a Senior School and a Prep School split over 2 sites. The  Senior School has six main buildings: Johnson Building, Grayson Building, Endcliffe Building, Oakholme Building, Westbury Building, and the Science Block.

The Lower School (ages 11–12) are based in the Johnson building, Middle School (ages 13–15) in the Oakholme building and the Sixth Form (ages 16–18) in the Grayson building.

Houses 

There is a House system employed at Birkdale Senior School, four in total, each named after old Head Masters. Each house consists of a House Master who is a member of faculty, a House Captain who is a member of sixth form, and a dozen House Prefects also from the sixth form, chosen by faculty. Their roles consist of holding house assemblies and organising house events. The heads of school, as well as the sixth form prefects, operate independently from the house prefects.

The current Housemasters are Mr Michael Clarke (Asterley), Mr Christopher Rodgers (Griffiths), Mr Thomas Clark (Hall) and Mr Andrew Alsop (Heeley).

The Prep School had a slightly different house system, with a house dedicated to J.G. Roberts, Head Master 1933 – 43, and one to the family of Sir John Osborn, Conservative MP for Sheffield Hallam 1959 – 1987, of Osborn House, the current site of the Preparatory School. Martin House is named after Cyril Martin, who gained the Military Cross in the First World War and the George Cross in the Second World War. Westbury House was the fourth house. As of September 2020, the Prep department has adopted the same Houses as the Senior School.

The Birkdalian 
The Birkdalian has, since the mid-twentieth century, been the school magazine. Currently published once a year late in the Christmas term it provides an account of a year in the life of the school. Articles are written by staff and pupils and edited by a small group of staff and senior pupils.

Administration 

The Head Master is Mr Peter Harris, who was previously the Principal of Ewell Castle School and taught Geography at Birkdale between 1998 and 2009. The previous Head Master was Dr Paul Owen, who is the current Head of Stockport Grammar School. The Deputy Head of Senior School is Mr Phillip King, who succeeded Mr Nicolas Pietrek (who is now the Head of Thorpe House School Trust). The Head of the Prep School is Mr Chris Burch.

Sport 

Birkdale has its own playing fields, Castle Dyke, within a few miles of the main school site. There was a £2 million investment after acquiring a 125 year lease for the 30 acre Castle Dyke playing fields and the construction of a new state-of- the-art Sports Pavilion, which opened in 2006. On campus, the school has a sports hall and attached gym.

Competitive matches are played weekly – rugby and hockey in the winter term, football and hockey in easter, and cricket in summer. Teams are entered into various regional and national tournaments, such as the Rosslyn Park Sevens tournament and ISFA football tournaments. Sports tours depart annually – recent trips have included a rugby tour to Canada, cricket to Dubai and hockey to Holland.

During the 2007–08 school year, the U16 Rugby team reached the national quarter final of the Daily Mail Vase.

Head Masters

Nepal 

As part of the school's charity projects it has developed strong links with some institutions in and around Kathmandu in Nepal. Most notable are the Peace Garden School, for which the school has helped raise money for a new school building, and a leper colony on the outskirts of Kathmandu, where Birkdale is helping to build new facilities and a new school. Money has also been granted to other schools to help purchase equipment or develop facilities.

As with other school charity projects, the money is raised through charity events and fund-raisers (as opposed to taking it from the school accounts). Since the year 2000, trips have been run once a year to Nepal for pupils and teachers.  These involve volunteer work teaching or otherwise working at the schools and leper colony as well as a trek in the Annapurna region and a visit to the Chitwan jungle. The trips are considered crucial in maintaining strong personal links with contacts in Nepal, and helping charitable funds to be focused effectively.

As well as links with Nepal, the school has begun to form links with J. E. B. Stuart High School in Virginia, USA, following on from a teacher exchange.

Notable alumni 
Cyril Martin GC, MC (1897–1973), soldier and George Cross recipient.
Sir Rex Harrison (1908–1990), actor.
Sir Paul Kennedy, KC (born 1935), former Lord Justice of Appeal.
Sir Michael Palin (born 1943), comedian, actor, traveller and writer.
Bruce Dickinson (born 1958), musician.
Ian G. Walker (born 1958), industrialist.
Mark Roe (born 1963), golfer.
Sir John Holbrook Osborn (1922–2015), MP for Sheffield Hallam 1959–87
Lord Allan of Hallam (Formerly Richard Allan, MP) (born 1966), Liberal Democrat Peer.
Richard Coyle (born 1972), actor.
 David Jennings (born 1972), composer.
Justin Wilson (1978–2015), racing driver.
Stefan Wilson (born 1989), racing driver.
Charlie Davies (born 1989), Rugby Union player.
Zhou Guanyu (born 1999), Formula 1 racing driver.
Phoenix Laulu-Togaga'e (born 2003), Rugby League player.

References

External links

Private schools in Sheffield
Member schools of the Headmasters' and Headmistresses' Conference
 
Educational institutions established in 1904
1904 establishments in England